David Ferrer was the defending champion but lost in the first round to Galo Blanco.

David Sánchez won in the final 6–2, 6–2 against Nicolás Massú.

Seeds
A champion seed is indicated in bold text while text in italics indicates the round in which that seed was eliminated.

  Nikolay Davydenko (first round)
  Nicolás Massú (final)
  Sargis Sargsian (quarterfinals)
  David Sánchez (champion)
  Paul-Henri Mathieu (quarterfinals)
  David Ferrer (first round)
  Fernando Vicente (first round)
  Alberto Martín (second round)

Draw

External links
 2003 BCR Open Romania draw

Romanian Open
Singles
2003 in Romanian tennis